Myrmechis is a genus of flowering plants from the orchid family, Orchidaceae. It is native to eastern and southeastern Asia from the Kuril Islands south to New Guinea, west to the Himalayas.

Myrmechis aurea (J.J.Sm.) Schuit. - Maluku
Myrmechis bakhimensis D.Maity, N.Pradhan & Maiti - Sikkim
Myrmechis bilobulifera (J.J.Sm.) Schuit. - Sulawesi
Myrmechis chalmersii (Schltr.) Schuit. - New Guinea
Myrmechis chinensis Rolfe - Sichuan, Hubei, Fujian
Myrmechis drymoglossifolia Hayata - Taiwan
Myrmechis glabra Blume - Java
Myrmechis gracilis (Blume) Blume - Java, Sumatra, Philippines
Myrmechis japonica (Rchb.f.) Rolfe - Japan, Korea, Kuril Islands, Fujian, Sichuan, Tibet, Yunnan 
Myrmechis kinabaluensis Carr - Sabah
Myrmechis perpusilla Ames - Luzon
Myrmechis philippinensiis Ames - Philippines
Myrmechis pumila (Hook.f.) Tang & F.T.Wang - Yunnan, Bhutan, Assam, Myanmar, Nepal, Thailand, Vietnam
Myrmechis quadrilobata (Schltr.) Schuit. - Sulawesi
Myrmechis seranica J.J.Sm. - Seram
Myrmechis tsukusiana Masam. - Yakushima
Myrmechis urceolata Tang & K.Y.Lang - Yunnan, Guangdong, Hainan

See also 
 List of Orchidaceae genera

References 

 Pridgeon, A.M., Cribb, P.J., Chase, M.A. & Rasmussen, F. eds. (1999). Genera Orchidacearum 1. Oxford Univ. Press.
 Pridgeon, A.M., Cribb, P.J., Chase, M.A. & Rasmussen, F. eds. (2001). Genera Orchidacearum 2. Oxford Univ. Press.
 Pridgeon, A.M., Cribb, P.J., Chase, M.A. & Rasmussen, F. eds. (2003). Genera Orchidacearum 3. Oxford Univ. Press
 Berg Pana, H. 2005. Handbuch der Orchideen-Namen. Dictionary of Orchid Names. Dizionario dei nomi delle orchidee. Ulmer, Stuttgart

External links 

Cranichideae genera
Goodyerinae